Spasm Geyser is a geyser in the Lower Geyser Basin of Yellowstone National Park in the United States.

Spasm Geyser is part of the Fountain Group. It is located near the walkway past Fountain Geyser, in front of Clepsydra Geyser, and to the right of Jelly Geyser.

It is connected to Fountain Geyser, ceasing play during Fountain's eruption.

References 

Geysers of Wyoming
Geothermal features of Teton County, Wyoming
Geothermal features of Yellowstone National Park
Geysers of Teton County, Wyoming